The All Jammu and Kashmir Muslim Conference also shortly referred as Muslim Conference (MC) is a political party in Pakistan administrated territory of Azad Jammu and Kashmir. The party was founded by Chaudhry Ghulam Abbas in the former princely state of Jammu and Kashmir as a splinter group of the Jammu & Kashmir National Conference. 

After the Partition of India, the party supported the accession of the princely state to Pakistan, and instigated the Poonch Rebellion against the Maharaja's government under the leadership of its legislator Sardar Muhammad Ibrahim Khan. Pakistan, after turning the rebellion into an outright invasion, installed Ibrahim Khan as the President of the rebel-conrolled region, called Azad Jammu and Kashmir. 

The Muslim Conference has ever since held the reins of power in Azad Kashmir, supported by the Government of Pakistan.

See also 
 Political movements during the Dogra rule
 1947 Poonch Rebellion
 Sardar Muhammad Ibrahim Khan

References

Islamic political parties in Pakistan
Political parties in Azad Kashmir